Solomon the Exilarch ruled the Diaspora Jewish community as Exilarch from 730 to 761. He was the son of the exilarch Hasdai I. In consequence of a dearth of teachers, he installed a scholar from Pumbedita as head of the Academy of Sura a scholar from Pumbedita. This was contrary to traditional usage. According to Grätz, this scholar was Mar ben Samuel; according to Weiss, Mar Rab Judah ben Rab Naḥman. In the genealogical claim of Anan ben David, the founder of the Karaite sect, Solomon is omitted.

References

External links
 Solomon I the Exilarch- Jewish Encyclopedia

Exilarchs
8th-century Jews
Jews from the Abbasid Caliphate
Jewish royalty